Tris(glycinato)cobalt(III) describes coordination complexes with the formula .  Several isomers exist of these octahedral complexes formed between low-spin d6 Co(III) and the conjugate base of the amino acid glycine.

Structures

Both a meridional isomer and a facial isomer are known.  In the former the Co-O bonds share a plane, and in the facial isomer they do not.  Each of these two isomers exists also as pairs of stereoisomers, termed Δ and Λ.  This set of compounds are prototypes of many tris(aminocarboxylate) complexes, with the notable distinction that the Co(III) derivatives do not isomerize readily and can thus be separated.  

The violet isomer is obtained anhydrous, whereas the red derivative is the monohydrate.  X-ray crystallographic characterization of the mer isomer demonstrates the existence of a dihydrate, however.

Synthesis
The reaction of glycine with sodium tris(carbonato)cobalt(III) produces both the violet meridional and red-pink facial isomers in approximately equal amounts.  The compounds are separated by fractional crystallization. These complexes have been characterized by X-ray crystallography.

Similar synthetic methods apply to the preparation of tris(chelates) of other amino acids.  With L-alanine, L-leucine, and other amino acids, one obtains four stereoisomers.  With cysteine, the amino acid binds through N and thiolate.

The isomeric forms of tris(glycinato)cobalt(III) are poorly soluble in water.  The solubility increases considerably in acidic solution.

References

Cobalt complexes
Cobalt(III) compounds
Octahedral compounds
Glycinates